Michael Thomson (born ) is a South African male  track cyclist, riding for the national team. He competed in the keirin event at the 2010 UCI Track Cycling World Championships.

References

External links
 Profile at cyclingarchives.com

1983 births
Living people
South African track cyclists
South African male cyclists
Place of birth missing (living people)
Cyclists at the 2008 Summer Paralympics
Paralympic cyclists
Paralympic bronze medalists for South Africa
Medalists at the 2008 Summer Paralympics
Paralympic medalists in cycling
20th-century South African people
21st-century South African people